Icare may refer to:

icare (insurance), state insurance company in New South Wales, Australia
 Eçara, village in Azerbaijan
ICare Food Bank, a food bank in Nigeria
ICARE Institute of Medical Sciences and Research, medical college in India founded by Indian Centre for Advancement of Research and Education

See also
, including various titles using the French name for Icarus
I Care (disambiguation)